Marc Weigert (born June 3, 1970) is a film producer and film/TV visual effects supervisor and 2nd unit director.

Early career
Weigert was born in Bad Harzburg, Germany. While in Christian-von-Dohm-Gymnasium, a grammar school in Goslar, Germany, he developed an interest in filmmaking. He moved on to study directing and producing from 1991 to 1994 at the Film Academy Baden-Württemberg. There he met Volker Engel, who would later win the Academy Award for the visual effects of Independence Day and become Weigert's business partner in the production company Uncharted Territory, LLC. During his studies, Weigert was visual effects producer for Volker Engel on the television film Der Letzte Kosmonaut, directed by Nico Hofmann. The film won the "Prix Futura". He also produced several commercials and award-winning short films for German TV. Weigert moved to Los Angeles in 1994, after receiving a scholarship from a German producer's association.

Later career
In 1995, Weigert founded the company Dreamscape Imagery Inc. with his wife Stacey. He became VFX Project Manager for the film Independence Day (1996), for which Weigert created "Digital Assistant for Visual Effects", a project management software to manage, schedule and track the filming of VFX elements. In conjunction with the software, Weigert also developed a design for a visual effects production board, in conjunction with manufacturing company Hollywood Production Boards. Between 1996 and 2000, he created new software versions to include the post-production process. Digital Assistant for Visual Effects has been used for several feature films, including Stuart Little, Alien Resurrection, Flubber, Volcano, Godzilla, Wing Commander, Monkeybone, Bless the Child and X-Men, as well as on television films and series. Dreamscape Imagery Inc. sold the source code to the Internet company Creative Planet Inc. in 2000.

As visual effects supervisor for Dreamscape, Weigert worked on a plethora of international feature films, television films, series and commercials, most notably Disney's Flubber, Muppets from Space and The Drew Carey Show. He also worked on several documentaries, earning Dreamscape the CINE Golden Eagle award.

In 1997, Weigert held the master class "action with effects" for the European Film Academy. In 2014, he taught a second master class for the EFA and thus became the only instructor to hold two EFA master classes in his lifetime. He also taught digital compositing classes at the Art Institute of California - Los Angeles, was speaker at the iHollywood Forum and the Producers Guild of America (PGA)'s first "produced by" conference in Los Angeles in 2009. He also spoke at the Society of Motion Picture and Television Engineers (SMPTE) conference, SIGGRAPH Los Angeles and Vancouver conferences, FMX Germany, the University of Applied Sciences in Salzburg, Austria and the HPI School of Design Thinking at the Hasso Plattner Institute, Berlin

In 1999, he founded the production company Uncharted Territory LLC with long-time friend and colleague Volker Engel. The first production, and Weigert's first film as a producer, Coronado, was shot in 2001 in Mexico. The film was written by Weigert, Engel and director Claudio Faeh. In 2003, Weigert co-produced the film Dark Kingdom: The Dragon King and served as visual effects director together with Volker Engel. Dark Kingdom, aka Ring of the Nibelungs is based on the same Germanic myth as Richard Wagner's opera series Der Ring des Nibelungen. In-between film productions, Uncharted Territory also created the Intermedia logo animation which premiered before Terminator 3: Rise of the Machines and provided visual effects services for Roland Emmerich's The Day After Tomorrow in 2004. In 2005, Weigert wrote the screenplay Southern Skies and produced the miniseries The Triangle together with Engel and Kelly Van Horn, for executive producers Bryan Singer and Dean Devlin.

In 2006, Weigert won the Emmy Award for The Triangle.

In 2006, Weigert wrote the screenplay Force Majeure und co-wrote Raising Phoenix and Red Sea with writer Kurt Frey and Volker Engel. He also served as visual effects supervisor on the Canon EOS commercial "Welcome to the Playground". In 2007, he served as visual effects supervisor for Kellogg's and Tropicana commercials, and as vfx producer for Cafe FX, working - amongst other projects - on the Hogwarts castle ride film for the new Harry Potter Island of Adventure at Universal Studios Florida.

In 2008-2009, Weigert co-supervised and co-produced Roland Emmerich's 2012 for Sony Pictures with his business partner Volker Engel.

In 2010, Weigert was executive producer and VFX supervisor for the film Anonymous, again for director Roland Emmerich. In 2012/13, Weigert was VFX supervisor, co-producer, and 2nd unit director for Emmerich's "White House Down". He led a 70-people strong 2nd Unit for exterior Montreal and Washington, D.C. shoots, including the iconic car chase between the presidential limousine ("the beast" ) and secret service vehicles on the White House lawn.

In July 2014, Weigert was named President of Method Studios worldwide. Method Studios is headquartered in Los Angeles, California, and has 9 facilities, including New York, London, Vancouver, Chicago, Detroit, Atlanta, Sydney and Melbourne. He left Method after one year in June 2015. In July 2015, Weigert joined the production of Independence Day: Resurgence as VFX Producer, 20 years after the first Independence Day. In the same year, he was voted into the prestigious American Society of Cinematographers (ASC) as associate member. In June 2016, he started as co-producer and VFX producer on "Nutcracker and the four realms" for the Walt Disney Company, released worldwide in November 2018.

Weigert is a member of the Directors Guild of America (DGA), Producers Guild of America (PGA), the Academy of Television Arts and Sciences (ATAS) and the Visual Effects Society (VES). He was part of the ASC/ADG/VES subcommittee on Previsualization and the joint committee on virtual production of the ASC, ADG, VES, PGA and Previsualization society. He also writes a blog called "tracking marc" for Animation World Network (AWN) at http://www.awn.com/blogs/tracking-marc.

Marc resides on Saint Thomas, U.S. Virgin Islands

Awards
 Emmy Award for The Triangle in 2006
 Satellite Award for 2012 in 2009
 Nominated for Online Film&Television Association (OFTA) Award in 2010
 Nominated for three VES awards (2010 for 2012, 2011 for "Anonymous", and 2014 for White House Down)
 Nominated for a Saturn Award in 2010 for 2012
 Nominated for a Broadcast Film Critics Association Award in 2010 for 2012

References
 imdb: The Nutcracker and the Four Realms
 imdb: Independence Day: Resurgence
  Variety: Marc Weigert named President of Method Studios
  Hollywood Reporter: VFX vet Marc Weigert joins Method Studios
 Animation World Network "Tracking Marc" blog
 imdb: White House Down
 
 imdb: 2012
 Academy of Television Arts and Sciences (ATAS)
 Scifi.com - emmy award
Wikipedia: The Triangle (miniseries)
 imdb: The Triangle
 imdb: Dark Kingdom (aka Ring of the Nibelungs)
 imdb: Coronado
 The Hollywood Reporter: Emmy awards 2006
 Uncharted Territory, LLC
 Dreamscape Imagery Inc.
 Vfxblog on Dynamicfx.com
 iHollywood Forum
 EFA European Film Academy Programme
 Cinefex weekly update
 Variety review: The Triangle

External links
 
 Marc Weigert personal website
 Uncharted Territory, Inc website
  Method Studios website

1970 births
Living people
Mass media people from Lower Saxony
Special effects people
Visual effects supervisors
Emmy Award winners